Dexter Reed may refer to:

Dexter Reed (basketball), a successful collegiate basketball player for the Memphis State Tigers
Dexter Reed, a fictional character in the movie Good Burger
Dexter Reed, Katie Noonan's son